Fabricio Brener (born 26 May 1998) is an Argentine professional footballer who plays as a winger in F.C. Motagua of Honduras first division.

Career
Brener started off his first-team career with Belgrano of the Argentine Primera División. He made his professional debut on 25 August 2017 during a league loss at Banfield, which was followed by his first goal against Gimnasia y Esgrima in his sixth senior appearance. Brener was picked thirteen times in the 2017–18 season. In January 2019, Brener joined Primera B Nacional's Villa Dálmine on loan. He remained until 31 December, appearing sixteen times in all competitions across two campaigns whilst also netting two goals; both came in a 3–0 home victory with Deportivo Riestra on 21 September.

PAS Giannina (On Loan) 
On 6 October 2020, Brener completed a loan move to Greek football with newly-promoted Super League team PAS Giannina; he was assigned the number eight shirt. He debuted in a win away to Apollon Smyrnis on 21 October, coming on to replace Sandi Križman with fourteen minutes left. He made three further appearances off the bench, before making back-to-back starts in December against Lamia and Panathinaikos.On 14 March 2021 he scored his first goal for winning victory awaw against Asteras Tripolis in the season 2020–21 in Super League Greece.

Career statistics
.

References

External links

1998 births
Living people
Argentine people of German descent
Footballers from Córdoba, Argentina
Argentine footballers
Association football midfielders
Argentine expatriate footballers
Expatriate footballers in Greece
Argentine expatriate sportspeople in Greece
Argentine Primera División players
Primera Nacional players
Super League Greece players
Club Atlético Belgrano footballers
Villa Dálmine footballers
PAS Giannina F.C. players
F.C. Motagua players